Tsinghua University Library System consist of the Main Library and six branch libraries: Humanities & Social Sciences Library, Economics & Management Library, Law Library, Architecture Library, Fine Arts Library, and Finance Library. The Main Library, with a total construction area of 42,820 square meters, consists of the Old Library, West Library (Yifu Library) and North Library (Mochtar Riady Library). The West and North Libraries are integrated harmoniously in style with the Old Library.

History

Tsinghua Xue Tang was founded in 1911 (Chinese: 清华学堂).

When Tsinghua Xue Tang was renamed Tsinghua College in 1912, a small-scale "Tsinghua Library Room" was established formally.

The stand-alone library building (now the East section of the Old Library) was completed in March 1919. It was designed by the American architect, Henry Murphy. Upon moving into the new building, it was named Tsinghua College Library. It was one of the four earliest buildings on the campus.

Tsinghua College became the National Tsinghua University in 1928. The rapid increase of its acquisitions budget and library collections year by year outgrew the capacity of the building, which led to the expansion of the Library. The addition of the central and Western sections of the present Old Library began in March 1930. It was designed by the famous architect Yang Tingbao and completed in November 1931. After the establishment of the university, a Library Standing Committee was formed. Around the same time, most of the schools and departments had established their own branch libraries.

From October 1935 to September 1936, the famous litterateur, Prof. ZHU Ziqing was the Chairman of the Library Committee and Library Director. Before the beginning of the Anti-Japanese War, the Library collection had reached more than 360,000 volumes.

During the Anti-Japanese War period, Tsinghua University was forced to move to the South.

In April 1938, after moving to Kunming, Tsinghua University, Peking University, and Nankai University formed the National Southwest Associated University. Tsinghua Library shipped more than 23,000 volumes to the new university. The collection in transit suffered from Japanese Army's bombing. Of the 10,000 volumes that were stored in Chongqing temporarily, only 3,000 survived.

In 1946, after the victory of the Anti-Japanese War, Tsinghua University returned to the original campus in Beijing, but the Library was no longer there as it was. During the war, the library was used as a hospital by the Japanese army. The library collection suffered a heavy loss of 175,000 volumes. On the eve of the Liberation, there were only 410,000 volumes left.

Since Tsinghua University's liberation on December 15, 1948, the Library embarked on a healthy development path again.

Under the nationwide higher education restructuring plan in 1952, Tsinghua University was changed from a comprehensive university to a polytechnic university. All humanities, science, and some engineering and technical colleges and departments were transferred to other universities. The corresponding library collections were also transferred at the same time. By 1958, the Library had transferred out 180,000 volumes. Fortunately, 300,000 rare ancient books, oracle bone inscriptions, bronzes and other precious cultural relics were preserved under the instruction of then-president, Jiang Nanxiang. To support the education and research needs of the restructured university, the library acquisition policy focused on engineering materials as well as Marxism–Leninism works and modern literature. The collection had grown to 1.35 million volumes by 1966.

During the Cultural Revolution, the budget of the library was deeply cut. The Library stopped buying or subscribing to many important books and periodicals. Fortunately, with the help of faculty, students and librarians, most of the existing collections survived. After the Third Plenary Session of the 11th Central Committee of the CPC in 1978, the education sector began to develop rapidly. Since the late 1970s, Tsinghua University began to adjust its disciplines, gradually restored sciences, humanities and other departments, and re-expanded into a comprehensive university. With the university continuous expansion of its disciplinary scope, the variety and quantity of the library collections had also increased to 2.5 million volumes (pieces) by 1990

In September 1991, the West Library (Yifu Library), which was designed by an academician of Tsinghua University, Guan Zhaoye, was built. The construction was supported by the donation of Sir Run Run Shaw and an appropriation by the Ministry of Education. The West Library followed the same architectural style and was integrated harmoniously into the Old Library.

Since 1999, the university has successively established a number of subject libraries: Humanities & Social Sciences Library, Economics & Management Library, Law Library, Architecture Library, Fine Arts Library, and Finance Library. These branch libraries use an integrated library management system to provide services to readers on a unified platform

During the Centennial Anniversary of Tsinghua University in 2011, the new Humanities & Social Sciences Library, located in the core teaching district of Tsinghua University, was completed. It was collaboratively designed by the famous Swiss architect, Mario Botta, and the China Academy of Architectural Sciences. It has become an important place for hosting academic and cultural resources and exchanges for the university

With the establishment of Tsinghua University People's

Bank of China School of Finance，the Finance Library was incorporated into the university library system and became the sixth branch library in 2012.

The North Library (Mochtar Riady Library) was completed in 2016. It was designed by Mr. Guan Zhaoye, an academician of the Chinese Academy of Engineering, a famous architectural designer and professor of Tsinghua University.

The new Law Library in Leo KoGuan Building opened for trial run May 29, 2019. It is the largest and best equipped law library among Chinese universities.

Overview of the Main Library buildings

Old Library 

The Old Library is built through the first phase (now located in the East part of the Old Library) and the second phase of the library project (now located in the central and Western parts of the Old Library). The construction area of the first phase is 2,114.44 square meters. When the first phase of the project was completed, the floor of the whole library was paved with cork or flower stones, the walls of the hall were covered with marble, and the stacks were paved with glass floor. The curtains and steel bookshelves were purchased from the United States, and all of them were built in accordance with the new fire prevention methods in Europe and the United States. It was viewed topnotch in the country at the time. After the completion of the second phase, the area of the library increased to 7,700 square meters, with a capacity for 300,000 books and more than 700 user seats.

In 2001, the Old Library, as a part of the "Early Buildings of Tsinghua University", was designated as a national key cultural relics protection unit, serial number 5-476. In 2016, it was listed in "The First Group of Chinese Architectural Heritage of the 20th Century".

West Library (Yifu Library) 

The construction area of the West Library is 20,120 square meters, and the total library area, after the completion of the new addition, is 27,820 square meters. The Old Library and the West Library are integrated into one piece, with red brick walls, grey tile sloping roof, arched doorways and windows. It achieved a high degree of harmony and unity in style and color. The layout of the library, its courtyard and surrounding areas form a solemn, elegant, beautiful and peaceful academic environment full of cultural atmosphere. It became a showcase of the university.

The West Library has won many national awards for architectural excellence. It has been rated as one of the "Top Ten Buildings in Beijing in the 1990s".

North Library (Mochtar Riady Library) 

The North Library (Mochtar Riady Library) covers an area of 15,000 square meters. It houses more than 600,000 books and more than 800 user seats. Having been integrated with the previous three phases of the library constructions, they form a comprehensive, multi-functional, modern and first-class library complex—the Main Library of Tsinghua University.

In 2018, the North Library received the gold medal in the Public Building of 2017-2018 Architectural Design Award from the Architectural Society of China.

Branch Libraries

The Humanities & Social Sciences Library 
The Humanities & Social Sciences Library is one of the important research-oriented subject libraries of Tsinghua University. It has a total building area of about 20,000 square meters and seven floors, including two underground floors. It provides more than 900 user seats.

Law Library 

The new Law Library in Leo KoGuan Building covers a construction area of 10,000 square meters. It houses an estimated collection of one million books and 651 user seats, and is equipped with self-check machine, individual study rooms, and other facilities.

Arts Library 
The Arts Library covers a total area of 3,000 square meters. It provides more than 200 user seats and holds more than 190,000 books.

Finance Library 
The Finance Library is in Tsinghua University People's Bank

of China School of Finance. It consists of two parts: open stacks and an underground stack, with a total area of about 1,200 square meters. It has an estimated collection capacity of 110,000 volumes and 100 user seats.

Economics & Management Library 
The Economics & Management Library is located in the Jianhua Building. It has a total construction area of 900 square meters and provides 100 user seats.

Architecture Library 
The Architecture Library is located in the Architecture School. It has a total area of 650 square meters and 72 user seats.

Library Collections 
By the end of 2019, the total physical collection of Tsinghua University Library (including branch libraries and departmental reference rooms) is about 5,386,300 volumes. It is a comprehensive collection in broad types and formats that covers all disciplines.

In addition to the printed books in Chinese and foreign languages, there are also other document resources available to readers:

 More than 222,400 thread-bound ancient books
 More than 607,500 bound periodicals
 Annual subscription of more than 2,447 titles of Chinese and foreign language newspapers & periodicals
 More than 165,800 Tsinghua University theses and dissertations
 More than 28,200 microforms
 More than 743 databases
 More than 170,000 full-text e-journals
 More than 9.54 million e-books
 More than 9.36 million electronic theses and dissertations

Services and Facilities 
The library has advanced network and IT infrastructure to support IPv6 and Gigabit access. Its wireless network covers the whole library. Readers can easily search the collection and access various professional databases.

In 2017, the library has completed the migration of the library management service system from MILLENNIUM to ALMA. The library resources management service system provides one-stop retrieval and seamless access to the readers for all the  electronic resources at any time and from any place.

The library provides a variety of self-service equipment, such as check-out machines and printing.

With the wide application of computers, reference work is becoming more and more active. The library offers a variety of information literacy education courses, various electronic resources and other types of training for faculty and students.

The subject librarian program keeps close contact with the departments and colleges and provides services proactively based on the needs in teaching and research. It sets up information service centers and provides services such as novelty search, paper-writing consultation, and information retrieval.

The faculty and students of Tsinghua University can also obtain information resources not held in Tsinghua University Libraries through interlibrary loan and document delivery services domestically and from abroad.

The library is actively exploring data integration and is promoting the construction of Tsinghua Scholars Repository on a large scale to enable customizable management of the academic output of scholars.

References

External links

 

Tsinghua University
Libraries in Beijing
Academic libraries in China
1916 establishments in China
Libraries established in 1916